Stronger is the sixth studio album by American country music artist Sara Evans. It was released in March 2011 via RCA Records Nashville.

Background
Stronger is Evans' first studio album to be released in nearly six years. During this six-year period, Evans was involved in a high-profile divorce with, her now ex-husband Craig Schelske. In an interview with CMT, Evans explained why she took so long to record the record saying, "I cannot be creative unless my world is right. A lot of people will say, 'You know when I was going through my divorce or when I was going through rehab or when I was going through whatever ... .' You always hear artists talk about, 'Those are the best songs I've written.' Like, I'm the total opposite".

In an interview with "The Boot", Evans spoke highly of the record saying, "I am so excited and thrilled to finally have NEW music coming out! It took me a long time to make this record for many reasons, both personally and professionally, and now it's all about to come to fruition. This new album is full of fresh new sounds from me, and many songs that I co-wrote, but it's also the signature Sara Evans sound that I hope will make the fans want to buy this record!" Also included is a song titled "Alone", and Evans has stated that she wants it released as the third single from the album, saying "There's a song called 'Alone' that is going to be the third single. It's a very country ballad, but I'm telling you, that song ... I have such high hopes that this song can really change my career".

"My Heart Can't Tell You No" was originally recorded by Rod Stewart on his 1988 album, Out of Order.

Reception

Commercial
The album debuted at number six on the U.S. Billboard 200, and at number one  on the U.S. Billboard Top Country Albums chart selling 55,000 copies in its first week of release. As of January 2014, the album has sold 405,000 copies in the US.

Critical

Upon its release, Stronger received generally positive reviews from most music critics. At Metacritic, which assigns a normalized rating out of 100 to reviews from mainstream critics, the album received an average score of 74, based on 5 reviews, which indicates "generally favorable reviews".

Jon Caramanica with The New York Times referred to the album as "modest" and "sharp" calling Evans an "unjustly underappreciated country singer who’s becoming more assured as she gets older". Thom Jurek with Allmusic gave the release a three star rating, noting the "traditional country" sound of the album; but also calling the release "formulaic" saying "Evans' fans will eat this up as welcome return to form. However, a more critical listen will reveal this set as a concession to Nashville's ever more restrictive, formulaic studio system". Matt Bjorke with Roughstock gave it a three star rating, saying it "features a strong mix of contemporary country music;  Stronger is an album that Sara Evans fans have been longing to have. Deborah Evans Price with Billboard gave it a favorable review, stating "Stronger, Sara Evans' first studio album in six years, is proof that some things are worth waiting for."

Jessica Phillips with Country Weekly gave it a 3½ star rating, calling the track "What That Drink Cost Me" "the album’s standout ballad" and compared Evans to Trisha Yearwood and Patty Loveless. Bill Friskics-Warren with The Washington Post gave it a favorable review, also comparing her voice to that of Patty Loveless. Michael McCall with the Associated Press gave the release a mixed review, saying "the anthemic songs fall flat: On the fist-pumping "A Little Bit Stronger" and the spiritually inclined "Desperately," Evans sounds oddly detached and the arrangements sound overly dramatic" but called the track "Alone" "the album's most powerful ballad".

Singles
"A Little Bit Stronger" was released as the album's first single on September 27, 2010. It became Evans' fifth number one hit on the U.S. Billboard Hot Country Songs chart and her first since "A Real Fine Place to Start" in October 2005. The album's second single "My Heart Can't Tell You No", was released on June 20, 2011, and peaked at number 21 in January 2012. "Anywhere," the third single, was released on July 23, 2012.

Track listing

Personnel 

Production and Technical
 Renée Bell – A&R direction 
 Sara Evans – producer (1, 4, 6, 8)
 Nathan Chapman – producer (1, 4, 6, 8)
 Matt Evans – associate producer (1, 4, 6, 8)
  Tony Brown – producer (2, 3, 5, 7, 10)
 Marti Frederiksen – producer (9), recording (9), vocal overdubs (9)
 Clarke Schleicher – mixing, recording (1, 4, 6, 8), vocal overdub assistant (1, 4, 6, 8)
 Jeff Balding – vocal overdubs (1, 4, 6, 8, 9), recording (2, 3, 5, 7, 10)
 Justin Niebank – mixing (1, 4, 6, 8)
 Andrew Bazinet – mix assistant (1-8, 10)
 Drew Bollman – mix assistant (1, 4, 6, 8)
 Lane McGiboney – vocal overdub assistant (1, 4, 6, 8, 9)
 Shawn Daugherty – recording assistant (1, 4, 6, 8)
 Todd Tidwell – recording assistant (1, 4, 6, 8), additional recording and engineering (1, 4, 6, 8)
 Leland Elliott – additional recording and engineering (1, 4, 6, 8)
 P.J. Fenech – additional recording and engineering (1, 4, 6, 8), mix assistant (2, 3, 5, 7, 9, 10)
 Kyle Ford – additional recording and engineering (1, 4, 6, 8)
 Jason Kyle – additional recording and engineering (1, 4, 6, 8)
 Matt Legge – additional recording and engineering (1, 4, 6, 8)
 Dave Matthews – additional recording and engineering (1, 4, 6, 8)
 Mark Petaccia – additional recording and engineering (1, 4, 6, 8)
 Scott Velazco – additional recording and engineering (1, 4, 6, 8)
 Taylor Pollert – recording assistant (2, 3, 5, 7, 10)
 Lowell Reynolds – recording assistant (2, 3, 5, 7, 10), mix assistant (2, 3, 5, 7, 10)
 Brian David Willis – digital editing (2, 3, 5, 7, 10)
 Mickey Jack Cones – vocal digital editing (9)
 Andrew Mendelson – mastering
 Jason Campbell – production coordinator (1, 4, 6, 8)
 Amy Garges – production coordinator (2, 3, 5, 7, 10)
 Judy Forde-Blair – creative producer, album notes
 Scott McDaniel – creative director
 Tracy Baskette-Fleaner – art direction, package design
 Russ Harrington – photography
 Tammie Harris Cleek – imaging, photo production
  Kaelin Evans – wardrobe stylist
 Colleen Runne – hair stylist, make-up

Vocals and Musicians
 Sara Evans – lead vocals, backing vocals
 John Barlow Jarvis – acoustic  piano, Wurlitzer electric piano 
 Tony Harrell – Wurlitzer electric piano, Hammond B3 organ
 Steve Nathan – Hammond B3 organ, synthesizers
 Marti Frederiksen – Hammond B3 organ, acoustic guitar, electric guitar, bass, drums, percussion, backing vocals
 Tom Bukovac – acoustic guitar, electric guitar
 Kenny Greenberg – acoustic guitar, electric guitar
 Nathan Chapman – acoustic guitar, electric guitar, backing vocals
 Marcus Hummon – acoustic guitar, backing vocals
 Brent Mason – electric guitar
 Bryan Sutton – acoustic guitar, banjo
 Darrell Scott – banjo, backing vocals
 Jerry Douglas – dobro
 Dan Dugmore – dobro, steel guitar
 Aubrey Haynie – fiddle, mandolin
 Jimmie Lee Sloas – bass
 Glenn Worf – bass 
 Matt Chamberlain – drums, percussion
 Greg Morrow – drums
 Eric Darken – percussion
 Stephanie Chapman – backing vocals
 Perry Coleman – backing vocals
 Kara DioGuardi – backing vocals
 Lesley Lyons – backing vocals
 Hillary Scott – backing vocals
 Ashley Evans-Simpson – backing vocals

Charts

Weekly charts

Year-end charts

Singles

ADid not enter the Hot 100 but charted on Bubbling Under Hot 100 Singles.

Certifications

References

2011 albums
RCA Records albums
Sara Evans albums
Albums produced by Tony Brown (record producer)
Albums produced by Marti Frederiksen